"Call of the Wild" is a song by British hard rock band Deep Purple. It appeared as the third track on their 1987 album The House of Blue Light. The song was released as a single later that year, and made it onto the UK Singles Chart at #92.

Personnel
Ian Gillan – vocals
Ritchie Blackmore – guitar
Roger Glover – bass
Jon Lord – keyboards
Ian Paice – drums

Deep Purple songs
1987 singles
Songs written by Ritchie Blackmore
Songs written by Ian Gillan
Songs written by Roger Glover
Songs written by Jon Lord